Austrolimulus fletcheri is an extinct xiphosuran, related to the modern horseshoe crab. The holotype and only known specimen is from Middle Triassic-aged strata of Brookvale, New South Wales of Australia.

References

Evolution: What the Fossils Say and Why It Matters by Donald R. Prothero and Carl Buell

External links
Xiphosura at Palaeos.com

Xiphosura
Middle Triassic arthropods